The 419th Tactical Fighter Training Squadron is an inactive United States Air Force unit.   It was last assigned to the 23d Tactical Fighter Wing and stationed at McConnell Air Force Base, Kansas.

History
Initially established by Tactical Air Command as an F-105 training squadron in August 1967 as the provisional 4519th Combat Crew Training Squadron:.   Re-designated as the AFCON 419th TFTS in October 1969, assuming the training mission of the provisional squadron.    Inactivated in October 1971 with the phaseout of the F-105 at McConnell.

Lineage
 Established as 4519th Combat Crew Training Squadron and activated on 1 August 1967
 Re-designated 419th Tactical Fighter Training Squadron on 15 October 1969
 Inactivated on 1 October 1971

Assignments
 23d Tactical Fighter Wing, 1 August 1967 – 1 October 1971

Stations
 McConnell AFB, Kansas, 1 August 1967 – 1 October 1971

Aircraft
 F-105 Thunderchief, 1967–1971

References

 Ravenstein, Charles A. (1984). Air Force Combat Wings Lineage and Honors Histories 1947–1977. Maxwell AFB, Alabama: Office of Air Force History. .

Fighter squadrons of the United States Air Force